James F. Glynn is a United States Marine Corps lieutenant general who serves as the deputy commandant for manpower and reserve affairs of the Marine Corps since October 2022. He commanded United States Marine Corps Forces Special Operations Command from June 2020 to May 2022.

Education 
Glynn graduated with a Bachelor of Science degree in 1989 from U.S. Naval Academy. Glynn earned a Master of Science Degree in National Security Affairs from the United States Army War College, a Master of Science Degree in Military Studies from the Marine Corps Command and Staff College and is a graduate of the Marine Corps Amphibious Warfare School.

Military career 
Glynn was commissioned in the United States Marine Corps as a Second Lieutenant in 1989 following graduation from United States Naval Academy. Glynn graduated from The Basic School and the Infantry Officers Course, then reported to 3rd Battalion, 3rd Marines at Marine Corps Base Hawaii in Kaneohe where he served as a rifle platoon commander throughout Operations Desert Shield/Desert Storm and later as the 81 mm Mortar Platoon Commander. He has served staff billets at: Marine Barracks, Washington, D.C.; executive officer, 1st Battalion, 4th Marines, Camp Pendleton; Marine Corps Recruiting Station, San Antonio; G-3, Future Operations, 1st Marine Expeditionary Force and Director, Regional Operations (J3) Special Operations Command - Africa from May 2010 to July 2011. Glynn served in Iraq from 2006 to 2007 as the Battalion Landing Team Commanding Officer, 2nd Battalion, 4th Marines, 15th Marine Expeditionary Unit. As a Colonel, Glynn served as commanding officer of the Marine Raider Training Center, formerly known as MARSOC Special Operations School, from July 2011 to July 2013.

His most recent assignments include: Military Assistant to the Assistant Commandant of the Marine Corps from July 2013 to Aug 2015 and then as the Director of the Office of U.S. Marine Corps Communication, Headquarters Marine Corps from Sept 2015 to Jun 2017; Deputy Commanding General of Special Operations Joint Task Force, Operation Inherent Resolve (Forward) from July 2017 to July 2018; Commanding General, Marine Corps Recruit Depot Parris Island and Eastern Recruiting Region and assumed duties as commanding officer of United States Marine Forces Special Operations Command on 26 June 2020. Following that, he became deputy commanding general of the United States Marine Corps Training and Education Command.

On September 6, 2022, Glynn was nominated for promotion to lieutenant general and assignment as deputy commandant for manpower and reserve affairs of the United States Marine Corps. His nomination was confirmed by voice vote of the Senate on September 29, 2022.

Awards and decorations

References

United States Marine Corps generals
United States Naval Academy alumni
Recipients of the Defense Superior Service Medal
Recipients of the Legion of Merit
United States Marine Corps officers
United States Marine Corps personnel of the Iraq War
United States Army War College alumni
Recipients of the Meritorious Service Medal (United States)
Living people
Year of birth missing (living people)